This article presents a discography of multi-instrumentalist Jonathan Segel.

Solo recordings and major side projects

Solo recordings
 Storytelling (1988)
 Edgy Not Antsy (2003)
 Honey (2007)
 All Attractions (2012) 
 Apricot Jam (2012)
 Shine Out (2014)

Hieronymus Firebrain
 Hieronymus Firebrain (1991)
 Dr. Firebrain's Plane Crash Tape, Vol. 1 (1993)
 There (1994)
 Here (1994)

Jack and Jill
 Chill and Shrill (1995)
 Fancy Birdhouse (1997)
 Scissors and Paper (2000)

Chaos Butterfly
 Live at Studio Fabriken (2005) – live in Gothenburg, Sweden, with Biggi Vinkeloe
 threelivingthings (2005)
 Radio (2005)

Electronic and electro-acoustic solo projects
 Non-Linear Accelerator (2003)
 Rauk (2005)
 Amnesia/Glass Box (2005)
 Summerleaf (2006)
 Underwater Tigers (2007)

Various artists compilations
 Acoustic Music Project – A Benefit for Project Open Hand (1990)
 Pushing the Norton (1994) – as 5th Business

with Camper Van Beethoven

Studio albums
 Telephone Free Landslide Victory (1985)
 II & III (1986)
 Camper Van Beethoven (1986)
 Vampire Can Mating Oven (1987, EP)
 Our Beloved Revolutionary Sweetheart (1988)
 Tusk (2002)
 New Roman Times (2004)
 Popular Songs of Great Enduring Strength and Beauty (2008)
 La Costa Perdida (2013)
 El Camino Real (2014)

Live recordings and compilations
 Camper Vantiquities (1993) – rarities compilation
 The Virgin Years (1993) – with Cracker
 Camper Van Beethoven Is Dead. Long Live Camper Van Beethoven (2000) – rarities compilation
 Cigarettes & Carrot Juice: The Santa Cruz Years (2002) – box set
 includes Telephone Free Landslide Victory, II & III, Camper Van Beethoven, Camper Vantiquities, & Greatest Hits Played Faster (bonus live disc)
 In the Mouth of the Crocodile - Live in Seattle (2004) – live album
 Discotheque CVB: Live In Chicago (2005) – live album
 Look at All the Love We Found (2005) – appearance on Sublime tribute album

with Eugene Chadbourne
 Camper Van Chadbourne (1987)
 Eddie Chatterbox Double Trio Love Album (1988)
 Eugene Van Beethoven's 69th Sin-Funny (1991)
 Used Record Pile (1999)
 Revenge of Camper Van Chadbourne (1999)
 PsyCHADelidoowop (2001)

Other recordings

with Øresund Space Collective
 Different Creatures (2015)
 Ode to a Black Hole (2016)

Improvisational recordings
 Tempted to Smile (2003) – with Fred Frith and Joëlle Léandre
 Gen (2003) – with Shoko Hikage 
 Japan Improv CD Magazine (2003) – with Brent Larner's M-7 Ensemble
 Music + One (2006) – various artists, with Jon Raskin and Myles Boisen
 An Inescapable Siren Within Earshot... (2006) – with Moe! Staiano's Moe!Kestra
 Sonic Demons (2009) – with Lucio Menegon
 Emergency Rental (2011) – with Emergency String (X)tet and Rent Romus
 Skatch Surveillance (2012) – with T.D. Skatchit & Company

Additional side projects
 Granfaloon Bus, A Love Restrained (1992)
 Dieselhed, Dieselhed (1994)
 Dent, Stimmung (1995)
 The Electric Chairmen, Toast (1996) – with John Kruth and Victor Krummenacher
 The Lords of Howling, BaltimorePearlCrescentWhiteAdmiralSisterMeadowPaintedGodWillVisitYou (1997)
 Dent, Verstärker (1998)
 The Container, The Container (1998) – with Clyde Wrenn
 Clyde Wrenn, Long Day's Journey into Night (1999)
 The Noodle Shop, MoonDog Girl (1999) – with John Kruth, Elliott Sharp and Atilla Engin
 Clyde Wrenn, The Blue Cliff Record (2001)
 The Shimmers, The Way You Shine (2006)
 The Artichoke Project, Stimoceiver (2008)
 John Kruth, Splitsville – Sonic Impressions of Croatia (2008)

Selected guest appearances
 Yo, Once in a Blue Moon (1986)
 Frontier Wives, Rockinghorse Violins (1987)
 Spot 1019, This World Owes me a Buzz (1987)
 The Young Fresh Fellows, The Men Who Loved Music(1987)
 Walkabouts, Cataract (1988)
 Overwhelming Colorfast, Overwhelming Colorfast (1991)
 Big City Orchestra, Greatest Hits and Test Tones (1998) + various other BCO releases
 The Loud Family, Days for Days (1998)
 Magnet, Sharkbait (1999)
 Sparklehorse, Distorted Ghost (1999)
 Alison Faith Levy, My World View (2000)
 Victor Krummenacher, Bittersweet (2000)
 Mike Levy, Fireflies (2000)
 LD & the New Criticism, Tragic Realism (2006)
 Mossyrock, I Know I'm Not Wrong EP (2007)
 Victor Krummenacher, Patriarch's Blues (2008)
 Victor Krummenacher, Hard to See Trouble Coming (2015)

Soundtracks
Film soundtracks:
 The Invisibles – directed by Noah Stern (1999)
 Bunny – directed by Mia Trachinger (2000)
 Kickin' Chicken – directed by Joy Phillips (2001)
 100% Human Hair – directed by Ann Kaneko (2001)
 Love Will Travel – directed by Teddi Bennett (2002)
 Bill's Run – directed by Richard Kassebaum (2004)

References

External links
 
 Official website for recorded music
 Jonathan Segel at AllMusic

Discographies of American artists